Kay Adams (born Princetta Kay Adams; April 9, 1941) is an American country singer.

Biography 
Kay Adams was born Princetta Kay Adams in Knox City, Texas, the fourth of five children to Charley Alva Adams (1908–1969) and Ola May Henson (1914–1993). Her father was a talented fiddle player. She moved at the age of 10, along with her family, to Vernon, Texas.

In the 1960s, Adams arrived on the country scene with the songs "Six Days a Waiting," "Old Heart Get Ready," "Anymore," "Don't Talk Trouble To Me," "Trapped," "Roll Out The Red Carpet," "I Cried At Your Wedding," "Honky Tonk Heartache" and "She Didn't Color Daddy." She appeared as a regular on such Bakersfield based country music TV programs as Buck Owens’ Ranch and the Dave Stogner Show.

At the inaugural Academy of Country Music Awards, in 1965, Adams was named Top New Female Vocalist. Merle Haggard was named Top New Male Vocalist, while Top Male Vocalist and Top Female Vocalist went to Buck Owens and Bonnie Owens. The following year, Adams was nominated for Top Female Vocalist.

Before 1966, women never recorded songs about truck driving. Adams, however, had a hit that year with "Little Pink Mack," a song giving the point of view of a woman driver, which is the only song on the album by a woman. In the song her truck has chrome and it "has polka-dot curtains hangin' in the sleeper," but is the fastest big-wheeler on the road. In her "truck drivin' boots" she stands about five-foot three, but she can take care of herself. With a full-force Bakersfield sound twangy Telecaster and some fuzz-tone steel guitar backing, she delivers the story of a truck driving woman who makes it clear she "cut my baby teeth on a set of Spicer gears. I’m a gear-swappin’ mama, and I don’t know the meaning of fear." All the truckers are asked, "Who's the gal in the little pink Mack?"

It was just a couple years before Tammy Wynette sang the praises of standing by one’s man, and a decade before Loretta Lynn celebrated reproductive freedom in her controversial hit, "The Pill," but country singer Kay Adams demolished at least one gender stereotype in 1966 with her hit single "Little Pink Mack."

Adams's vocal style carried a lot of Wanda Jackson’s sassy, husky-throated rockabilly abandon, a hint of Wynette’s lovelorn sob and a sense of Connie Smith’s emotional openness. More than just a novelty tune, "Little Pink Mack" was a friendly-but-firm challenge to the testosterone and diesel-fueled world of the "knights of the highway," long distance truckers.

Adams was married first to Robert W. Willard, in 1958. They were divorced in 1967 at Bakersfield. She and her second husband also divorced. She married for a third time to songwriter Buck Moore. She and Willard had two sons, Daniel Ray Willard (born December 19, 1959)  and Stewart Wayne Willard (born December 16, 1961).

Her 1966 album A Devil Like Me Needs An Angel Like You, was a duo with singer Dick Curless. She also sang on the soundtrack-album of the western movie Killers Three (|1968), which also featured Merle Haggard and Bonnie Owens. In the 1970s, she recorded "I Never Got to Nashville" for Cliffie Stone's Granite Records. Most recently she recorded "Mama Was A Rock (Daddy Was A Rolling Stone)" in 1996 with BR5-49 for the compilation CD Rig Rock Deluxe: A Musical Salute To The American Truck Driver, and "Trixie's Diesel-Stop Cafe" with The Dixie Bee-Liners on their 2009 bluegrass concept album Susanville.

Kay Adams's albums include A Devil Like Me Needs An Angel Like You, Wheels And Tears, Make Mine Country, and Alcohol And Tears.

Discography

Albums

Singles

See also
Academy of Country Music
List of country music performers

References

External links

1941 births
Living people
People from Knox City, Texas
Country musicians from Texas
American country singer-songwriters
American women country singers
People from Vernon, Texas
King Records artists
Singer-songwriters from Texas
21st-century American women singers
21st-century American singers